Farmer Wants a Wife is an American reality television series, based on the British show of the same name, in which a bachelor farmer chooses a potential romantic partner among a group of 10 single city women.

The series first aired on The CW from April 30 to June 25, 2008.

The first American version consisted of 8 episodes, during which 10 women are trying to be chosen by a bachelor farmer. In that the format differed from the other international versions. Shooting locations in the United States were St. Charles, Orchard Farm, and Portage des Sioux, all in Missouri.

A second American version premiered on Fox in March 2023, with country music singer Jennifer Nettles serving as host.

The Farmer
Biographical data from The CW unless otherwise noted.

The city women
Biographical data from The CW unless otherwise noted.

Episode summaries

"Goodbye City...Hello Country"
Original Airdate: April 30, 2008
Ten young women arrive at the farm to meet Matt, who takes them to see the chickens, revealing Stephanie's secret fear of them. Matt's mom takes them around the house, where Josie is openly disgusted by the 19th Century style. Matt announces that his neighbor needs a hand collecting chickens. Upon arrival Matt announces that this is going to be the first challenge. Kanisha and Krista tied with 10 chickens each, and have a "coop off". Kanisha finally wins with 14 chickens. Josie collects none, saying that it is beneath her, while Stephanie gets four, overcoming her fear of chickens.

Matt invites everyone for a hayride around the countryside. He asks Stephanie and Josie if they really want to be a farmer's wife. During the ride, Josie's reply provokes an argument between the girls and when they return she and Kanisha have an argument.

The girls prepare for the elimination and arguments continue between the other girls and Josie. Matt asks the girls (excluding Kanisha because she won the challenge) to stand behind a chicken with their name on it. Whoever's chicken does not have an egg underneath it is eliminated. Stephanie is ultimately eliminated because she did not fit in.

Matt decides to spend some alone time with one of the girls and picks Christa to go with him. The girls help her prepare for her date with Matt. He brings her to a small canopy and a bench and they talk. Lisa, Brooke and Amanda toilet paper Matt's truck but are caught by him and Christa. She is outraged because they ruined her "almost perfect" date and more arguments arise.

  Challenge: Collecting Chickens
  Challenge Winner: Kanisha
  Chosen For Date: Christa
  Date: Talking on a small bench, under a canopy, and drinking
  Elimination: Finding an egg
  Eliminated: Stephanie

"Pigs & Cows & Sheep...Oh My"
Original Airdate: May 7, 2008
A romantic date between Matt and Stacey leads to some juicy gossip that is news to Matt. Back at the farm, Stacey and Lisa show their true colors around the pigs, and Matt takes the girls out for a wild night of bingo. At bingo, Josie insults the local bingo players; Matt smooths things over, but the group is embarrassed by Josie's attitude. At the local bar, Lisa and Brooke become "friendly" to the other local farmers, which causes Christa and the other girls to think that they are not interested in Matt, and are on the show for the wrong reasons. Josie is devastated about being eliminated, and refuses to leave. She makes a big scene demanding a "parting gift" from Matt. She finally leaves - without a gift.

  Challenge: Steve's Chores (Milk Goats, Spray Paint Cows and Clean Stalls)
  Challenge Winner: Krista
  Chosen For Date: Stacey
  Date: Watching a home movie
  Elimination: Bingo
  Eliminated: Josie

"Wet 'n Wild"
Original Airdate: May 14, 2008
  Challenge: Driving a tractor across a field and throwing hay bales into a trailer.
  Challenge Winner: Brooke
  Chosen For Date: Amanda
  Date: Dinner with Matt's Family
  Elimination: Stitching Name
  Eliminated: Krista

"Do-Si-Do"
Original Airdate: May 28, 2008
  Challenge: Collecting Sweet Corn (3 x 2 dozen)
  Challenge Winner: Brooke
  Chosen For Date: Kanisha
  Date: Horse back riding and watching a sunset
  Elimination: Pouring a drink
  Eliminated: Stacey

"As Country as Apple Pie"
Original Airdate: June 4, 2008
  Challenge: Baking an apple pie
  Challenge Winner: Amanda
  Chosen For Date: Ashley
  Date: Mother in Law House Restaurant
  Elimination: Name in lights (fireworks display)
  Eliminated: Lisa

"It's Show Time"
Original Airdate: June 11, 2008
  Challenge: Talent Show
  Challenge Winner: Brooke
  Chosen For Date: Brooke
  Date: Boating and picnic on lake
  Elimination: Reaching inside of a cow's rectum to see if cow is pregnant
  Eliminated: Ashley

"A Family Affair"
Original Airdate: June 18, 2008
  Challenge: None
  Challenge Winner: None
  Chosen For Date: Brooke & Christa
  Date: Hot tub
  Elimination: Firing at a Target w/ a Shotgun
  Eliminated: Kanisha & Amanda

"Farmer Picks a Wife"
Original Airdate: June 25, 2008
 Challenge: None
 Challenge Winner: None
 Chosen For Date: Brooke and Christa
 Date: Brooke on a four-wheeler to a picnic, Christa on a Horse Carriage to Matt's house
 Elimination: Crop Duster With Banner
 Eliminated: Christa

Elimination chart

Reboot
In September 2022, Fox ordered a reboot of the series, produced by Eureka Productions. Hosted by Jennifer Nettles, it premiered on March 8, 2023.

Ratings

The CW

Fox

References

External links

2000s American reality television series
2008 American television series debuts
2008 American television series endings
2020s American reality television series
2023 American television series debuts
American dating and relationship reality television series
American television series based on British television series
American television series revived after cancellation
English-language television shows
Fox Broadcasting Company original programming
Television series by Eureka
Television series by Fremantle (company)
Television shows filmed in Missouri
Television shows set in Missouri
The CW original programming
Works about farmers